Caroline Molinari (born ) was a Brazilian artistic gymnast, representing her nation at international competitions.

She participated at the 2004 Summer Olympics. She also competed at world championships, including the 2003 World Artistic Gymnastics Championships in Anaheim.

References

External links
Caroline Molinari at Sports Reference
http://hosted.ap.org/olympics/2004/GAW008.html
http://news.bbc.co.uk/sport2/hi/olympics_2004/gymnastics/results/3531318.stm

1986 births
Living people
Brazilian female artistic gymnasts
Place of birth missing (living people)
Gymnasts at the 2004 Summer Olympics
Olympic gymnasts of Brazil
Gymnasts at the 2003 Pan American Games
Pan American Games bronze medalists for Brazil
Pan American Games medalists in gymnastics
South American Games gold medalists for Brazil
South American Games silver medalists for Brazil
South American Games medalists in gymnastics
Competitors at the 2002 South American Games
Medalists at the 2003 Pan American Games